This is a list of commemorative stamps issued by Pakistan Post between the years 2007 and 2016.

 1947 to 1966
 1977 to 1986
 1977 to 1986
 1987 to 1996
 1997 to 2006
 2007 to 2016
 2017 to present

2007

In 2007 the post office issued 9 commemorative stamps.

 Platinum Jubilee Celebration of K.M.C. Building, Karachi 1932–2007, 1 stamp, ₨ 10, 16 January 2007
 Golden Jubilee of Cadet College Petaro, 1 stamp, ₨ 10, 28 February 2007
 International Women's Day, 1 stamp, ₨ 10, 8 March 2007
 Hugh Catchpole (educationist), 1 stamp, ₨ 10, 26 May 2007
 New Vision of Pakistan Post, 1 stamp, ₨ 4, 7 June 2007
 Pakistan Air Force – Defense Day, 1 stamp, ₨ 5, 6 September 2007
 First Anniversary of 3rd Meeting of the ECO Postal Authorities, 1 stamp,  ₨ 5, 22 September 2007
 Completion of 5 Year Term of National Assembly of Pakistan, 1 stamp ₨ 15, 15 November 2007
 Centenary Celebration of Catholic Cathedral Church, Lahore, 1 stamp, ₨ 5, 19 November 2007

2008
As per Siddiqui Stamps Catalogue 2014 Edition in 2008 Pakistan Post Office issued 6 Stamps and 3 Souvenir Sheets on 5 different occasions.

 3rd Anniversary of Earthquake – 8 October
 United Nations Human Rights Award 2008 For Mohtarma Benazir Bhutto – 10 December

References

2007